A saddle chair uses the same principles in its design as an equestrian saddle. It is equipped with a chair base on casters and a gas cylinder for adjusting the correct sitting height. The casters enable moving around and reaching out for objects while sitting. Some saddle chairs have backrests, but most do not. Some models also have a swing mechanism in the seat, which increases small movement mobility to the low back and stomach for the goal of better circulation in soft tissues. 

Riding-like sitting on a saddle chair differs from sitting on a conventional chair. Saddle chair users sit 20–30 cm higher, which puts the hips and the knees into a 135° angle, compared to the 90° angle typically associated with sitting on a traditional chair.

Because the saddle chair is higher than a normal office chair, the desk has to be higher as well. For this purpose there are desks that can be electronically or mechanically adjusted to fit the user. A saddle chair can also be used with a normal office desk, but then the desk has to be lifted up with height extension pieces or most practically with electric or gas spring mechanisms. 

The saddle chair seat is either solid or divided. A divided seat reduces pressure on the perineum, but also on the coccyx and the genitals on the pubic bone, and lowers the temperature in the genital area. A divided seat is thought to be healthier than a solid seat, for women but even more so for men, who´s genitals are all outside the body and easily to be pressed by the furniture.

Saddle chairs usually have height adjustments but also a tilt mechanism. There are divided saddle chair models with adjustable gap between the two seat parts and also swing mechanism, which increases the small movements of the pelvic and stomach. The goal of this is to increase circulation in the soft tissues for better tissue metabolism. Accessories, such as elbow and wrist supports, are available for saddle chairs to make different work tasks easier.

Benefits and adjustments

A side-saddle chair can benefit men by decreasing the testicular temperature, and may help both men and women with lumbar posture to be the naturel "standing posture", which helps the hole spine to reach the natural posture..    Bloomberg Businessweek endorsed the saddle chair, noting while there is no medical evidence it helps increase sperm production, it "tips your pelvis and spine into the right position and un-squishes your genitals. 

Adapting to a saddle chair takes time 0 day (if you are horse back rider or cyclist)up to 2-3 weeks, and requires a new kind of attitude towards sitting. The most common reason for using a saddle chair is that the users feel it is healthier for the back and legs than a standard chair. Many also feel, that the inhaling /oxygen intake is deeper in the good posture, and the shoulder tension gradually relieves . An intervention study on schoolchildren found that initially saddle chairs were liked better, but the difference leveled off over time.

References 

 Reijo Koskelo, Risto Pohjolainen, Osmo Hänninen: The function responses of upper secondary school students considering the saddle chair and the adjustable table. University of Kuopio. 1999-2000.

See also 
 Riding-like sitting
 Sitting
 Ergonomics

Ergonomics
Chairs